Lunn Island is a solitary island of Papua New Guinea in the Solomon Sea, belonging to the Louisiade Archipelago. The Deboyne Islands are another  eastward.

References

Islands of Milne Bay Province
Louisiade Archipelago
Uninhabited islands of Papua New Guinea